P. Abdul Hameed (Puliyakkuth Abdul Hameed)  is an Indian politician and the current MLA of Vallikunnu, Kerala. He is a senior politician from Pattikkad, 
near Perinthalmanna.

References

Indian Union Muslim League politicians
Year of birth missing (living people)
Living people
Kerala MLAs 2016–2021